NOVA Pro Wrestling (often referred to as simply NOVA Pro) is an American professional wrestling promotion that was established in 2015 based in Northern Virginia. The company's name comes from the abbreviation of its location, Northern Virginia ("NoVa"). The promotion was founded by Mike King Jr., and his son, Mike E. King, with the intention to showcase the top independent wrestlers of Virginia, Maryland, and the general Mid-Atlantic region, as well as bring some of independent wrestling's popular names to the Northern Virginia area. The debut show, titled "The NOVA Project", took place on September 25, 2015 in Fairfax, Virginia.

History 
NOVA Pro Wrestling began on Friday, September 25, 2015, with its first show, "The NOVA Project", taking place at the Jewish Community Center of Northern Virginia, in Fairfax. The event was presented by the Virginia promotion Ground Xero Wrestling (GXW), and was run using their promoter's license and much of their equipment. The first show, casually referred to as a pilot episode, was considered a borderline success, despite several last minute changes to the card. This was primarily due to issues related to Virginia's licensing committee, as the show took place with only one of the originally advertised matches taking place as planned.

NOVA Pro waited until the new year to run again, this time with their own promoter's license. The first show of 2016, titled "Stay Vicious", ran on Sunday, January 31, 2016, from the Annandale Sports Center in Springfield, Virginia. The promotion would continue to run, both in Springfield and Fairfax, every other month until July, when the frequency increased to monthly shows, as the crowds continued to grow. The company celebrated their one-year anniversary with "The NOVA Project 2" on September 16, 2016, which featured the first steel cage match in the promotion's history, capping off a year-long feud between Sonjay Dutt and Logan Easton Laroux. The last show of the calendar year took place on Black Friday, November 25, 2016, and featured one of the last independent wrestling appearances of Chris Hero before his second stint with the WWE.

2017 began for NOVA Pro Wrestling, with "RELoad" on Friday, February 17, 2017 drawing one of its biggest crowds at a brand new venue, the Annandale Volunteer Fire Department in Annandale, Virginia. This location would split time with the original Fairfax location for the year, with NOVA's return to Fairfax hosting the first ever Commonwealth Cup on Friday, April 14, 2017. The one-night, 12-man tournament was won by Logan Easton Laroux, and was made even more significant by his win in the finals over Arik Royal, who had previously been undefeated in NOVA Pro since its inception in 2015.

2017 continued to be a year of firsts for NOVA Pro, as the company slowly discovered its identity. June 10, 2017 featured the first ever tryout show, "Life Is Like A Box of Chocolates", with a full NOVA Pro show, "Hi Fidelity", later that evening as well. The show "American Slang '17", on July 14, was main evented by NOVA's first ever ladder match, between PWI Ultra J Champion Chet Sterling and Logan Easton Laroux. "Cool for the Summer", on August 18, 2017, marked the company's first ever sold-out crowd, and was headlined by a No Disqualification intergender match between Angelus Layne and Keith Lee. This match came about as the focal point of a feud between Layne and promoter Mike E. King, after Layne threw a fireball at the promoter's face one month earlier. Lee was brought in to face Layne in the first intergender main event, though not the first or only instance of intergender wrestling in the promotion's history.

Friday, September 22, 2017 marked a second consecutive sell-out crowd, this time in the larger Fairfax venue, for "The NOVA Project 3". As the promotion entered its third year of operation, it enjoyed significant growth in exposure thanks to features in The Washington Post and Washington City Paper, as well as many national outlets, in part thanks to appearances from viral sensation "The Progressive Liberal" Daniel Richards. Around this time, the promotion signed with streaming service Powerbomb.TV to make past shows available on the site, and announce their first live-streamed show on Thursday, December 28, 2017, main evented by Powerbomb TV Independent Champion Jonathan Gresham defending against Sonjay Dutt.

Since then, NOVA has announced that they will continue to make shows available on the service, as well as produce more live streamed shows in 2018. In June, NOVA Pro produced both a men's and women's Commonwealth Cup, although the early rounds of the Women's Cup were not available live as the show was a matinee.  In addition, in September, it was announced that NOVA Pro would do a show outside Virginia for the first time as the company would perform as part of WrestleMania 35 weekend.

Events

2015

2016

2017

2018

Working relationships 
In 2016, NOVA Pro Wrestling became a member of the governing body known as Pro Wrestling International, which included other promotions in the southeast and mid-Atlantic regions, such as CWF Mid-Atlantic and Premiere Wrestling Xperience. The relationship with PWI lasted for two years, and included title defenses of the Ultra J Championship. On January 7, 2018, in a tweet from the official account, NOVA Pro announced that they were no longer a member of Pro Wrestling International.

In August 2017, NOVA Pro announced that they had linked up with the streaming service Powerbomb TV, with a staggered rollout of the entire library of shows. On September 6, 2017, “The NOVA Project” marked NOVA Pro Wrestling's debut to the streaming service. Later that month, it was announced that the show “Such Great Heights” on December 28, 2017 would be the first ever live streamed event in the promotion's history. NOVA Pro has announced that they will continue to stream live on Powerbomb TV going forward.

Roster

Male roster 

 Arik Royal
 Beau Crockett
 Bobby Shields
 Breaux Keller
 Brian Johnston
 Cabana Man Dan
 Coach Gator (Manager)
 Coach Mikey (Manager)
 David Stark
 David Starr
 Devin Cutter
 Dominic Garrini
 Fred Yehi
 Graham Bell
 Gunner Miller
 Innocent Isaiah
 Isaiah Frazier
 Jake Garvin
 Jake Hollister
 Jaxon Stone
 Jay Sin
 John Kermon
 John Skyler
 Jonathan Gresham
 Josh Fuller
 Kerry Awful
 Kevin Ku
 Lance Lude
 Logan Easton Laroux
 Lucas Calhoun
 Mack Buckler
 Mason Cutter
 Matthew May
 Mikey Banker
 Money Greene
 Nick Gage
 Nick Iggy
 Paul Jordane
 Rob Killjoy
 Sage Philips
 Satu Jinn
 Sonjay Dutt
 Teddy King
 Tim Donst
 Tracy Williams
 Tripp Cassidy
 Victor Benjamin
 Wheeler YUTA

Tag teams & stables 
 Capital Vices (Jay Sin & Money Greene)
 The Carnies (Nick Iggy, Kerry Awful, & Tripp Cassidy)
 Fuller's House (Josh Fuller & Mack Buckler)
 Sadkampf (Dominic Garrini & Kevin Ku)
 The Gator Pit (Brian Johnson, Mikey Banker, Jake Garvin, & Satu Jinn, managed by Coach Gator)
 The Hooligans (Devin Cutter & Mason Cutter)
 The Main Attraction (Beau Crockett, Jake Hollister, Paul Jordane, & Teddy King)
 The Ugly Ducklings (Lance Lude & Rob Killjoy, managed by Coach Mikey)

Female roster 

 Allie Kat
 Aspyn Rose
 Barbi Hayden
 Brittany Blake
 Faye Jackson
 Harlow O’Hara
 Jordan Blade
 Jordynne Grace
 Lady Frost (manager)
 Laynie Luck
 LuFisto
 Penelope Ford
 Sahara Se7en
 Shazza McKenzie
 Terra Calaway
 Veda Scott

Staff and personnel 
 Todd Myers - Referee
 Chris Sharpe - Referee
 Bill Olsen - Referee
 Kevin Burr - Referee
 Andrew McHale - Referee
 Jason Heat - Play by Play Commentator
 Emil Jay - Color Commentator
 Lolo McGrath - Ring Announcer

Notable guests and alumni 

 The Barbarian
 Bravado Brothers
 Cedric Alexander
 Chase Owens
 Chris Hero
 Chuck Taylor
 Detective Dan Barry
 "The Progressive Liberal" Daniel Richards
 DJZ
 Donovan Dijak
 Jimmy Jacobs
 Joey Janela
 Keith Lee
 Kimber Lee
 Mia Yim
 Matt Cross
 Matt Tremont
 Rachael Ellering
 Rickey Shane Page
 Shane Strickland
 Tony Atlas
 Trevor Lee

Championships 
At present time, NOVA Pro Wrestling does not have any recognized championships.

Other accomplishments

See also 
List of independent wrestling promotions in the United States
Independent wrestling

References

External links 
 
 Twitter
 Facebook

Professional wrestling in Virginia
Entertainment companies established in 2015
Independent professional wrestling promotions based on the East Coast of the United States
Companies based in Virginia
2015 establishments in Virginia